Hampus Nilsson (born 17 July 1990) is a Swedish footballer who plays as a goalkeeper for Eskilsminne.

Career
Hampus Nilsson started his career in IFK Osby as a four year old. He played both as a field player and goalkeeper until the age of thirteen when he decided to focus on the latter. After a year at Landskrona BoIS he joined Helsingborgs IF where he would never get any first team playtime but instead spent several seasons on loan. During his loan with IFK Värnamo in 2010 he helped the club win promotion to second tier Superettan where he also played the following year and then with Ängelholms FF in 2012.

After being released by Helsingborg at the end of 2012 Nilsson was considering retiring from football when he was contacted by agent Markus Karlsson who arranged a trial for him with Allsvenskan club Djurgårdens IF which resulted in a two-year deal before the start of the 2013 Allsvenskan season. In October 2014 he signed a new four-year contract. He finally made his Allsvenskan debut for Djurgården in a 2–0 win against Falkenberg on 24 October 2015, playing for the first time instead of Kenneth Høie who spent the previous 101 games on the pitch.

On 11 August 2016 Nilsson was loaned out to Allsvenskan side Östersunds FK for the rest of the season due to the arrival of Andreas Isaksson.

On 1 December 2016 Nilsson signed for Falkenbergs FF. Nilsson was one out of six players who left the club at the end of 2019. On 8 January 2020, Nilsson signed a two year deal with Trelleborgs FF.

On 30 November 2021, Nilsson agreed to join Eskilsminne in the fourth-tier Division 2 for the 2022 season.

International career
Nilsson played two games for the Sweden national under-19 football team in 2007.

Personal life
Nilsson also played ice hockey in his youth, but when he signed with Landskrona BoIS in 2007 he made the decision to solely focus on football. After joining Djurgården he often stood with the singing section at the home games of the clubs hockey team, which quickly made him a favourite among the fans.

References

External links 
 
 Djurgårdens IF profile 

Swedish footballers
Sweden youth international footballers
Landskrona BoIS players
Helsingborgs IF players
Högaborgs BK players
IFK Värnamo players
Ängelholms FF players
Djurgårdens IF Fotboll players
Falkenbergs FF players
Trelleborgs FF players
Allsvenskan players
Superettan players
1990 births
Living people
Association football goalkeepers